

YouYi Games

The Farewell Series

2012 Stanković Continental Champions' Cup

Final 

Note: * indicates B team

Friendlies

Intercontinental Basket Strasbourg 2012

2012 Olympic Games

Quarter-final 

Australia men's national basketball team games
2012–13 in Australian basketball